The first lady or gentleman of Oregon is the spouse of the Governor of Oregon, if they have one. The role of the spouse of the governor of Oregon has never been codified or officially defined. The spouse figures prominently in the social life of the state, and some spouses have been assisted with a staff in the Office of the Governor.

Aimee Wilson is the current spouse of the governor of Oregon concurrent with the governor's term in office.

List

Provisional Government of Oregon

Territory of Oregon

State of Oregon

See also 

 List of governors of Oregon
 Governor of Oregon

References 

 
Lists of spouses
Governor of Oregon
Lists of people from Oregon